Conder Green railway station served the hamlet of Conder Green, in Thurnham, Lancashire, England, with trains to nearby Glasson Dock and Lancaster along the Glasson Dock branch line.

History 
Conder was opened by the London and North Western Railway on the 9th July 1883. However, the station was passed to the London, Midland and Scottish Railway during the Grouping of 1923, only to be closed seven years later on 7 July 1930.

The site today 
The trackbed through the former station is now part of the Lancashire Coastal Way and the larger Bay cycleway. The station itself still stands.

References

Former London and North Western Railway stations
Disused railway stations in Lancaster
Railway stations in Great Britain opened in 1883
Railway stations in Great Britain closed in 1930